The Poney du Logone is a breed of small horse or pony from the area of the Logone River in Chad and Cameroon, in west central Africa.

History 

There are many descriptions of the small horses of the Marba-Musey people of the flood-plain of the middle reaches of the Logone River in south-western Chad and northern Cameroon; among them are those of Dixon Denham in 1826 and Gustav Nachtigal in 1880. Horse-breeding in the area remained relatively unchanged until the 1980s; in 1985 the horse population there was estimated at 6000–6500 head.

In 2007 the Poney du Logone population in Chad was listed as "not at risk" by the FAO. In Cameroon the breed is considered a relic of the past, and to be at risk of extinction.

Characteristics 

The head of the Poney du Logone is not heavy, as is sometimes reported, but is well proportioned, with a slightly convex profile and wide nostrils. The principal coat colour is bay, followed by bay roan, chestnut and chestnut roan.

The Poney du Logone is one of two horse breeds reported to show tolerance of, or resistance to, tsetse-borne trypanosomosis, or "sleeping sickness". The other horse breed reported to be tolerant or resistant is the Bandiagara of Mali and Niger.

References

Further reading 

 
 

Horse breeds
Horse breeds originating in Cameroon